Édison Gabriel Realpe Solís (13 April 1996 – 22 December 2019) was an Ecuadorian footballer who played for L.D.U. Quito. He died in a car accident in Ecuador at the age of 23.

Club career
Realpe began his career with Guayaquil City in 2014.

On 31 January 2018, Realpe was loaned out to L.D.U. Quito for the 2018 season. After the loan spell ended, he signed permanently for the club.

Career statistics

Honours
LDU Quito
Ecuadorian Serie A: 2018
Copa Ecuador: 2019

References

1996 births
2019 deaths
Association football midfielders
Ecuadorian footballers
Afro-Ecuadorian
Ecuadorian Serie A players
Guayaquil City F.C. footballers
L.D.U. Quito footballers
2015 South American Youth Football Championship players
Ecuador youth international footballers
Ecuador under-20 international footballers
Sportspeople from Esmeraldas, Ecuador
Road incident deaths in Ecuador